The football tournament at the 1946 Central American and Caribbean Games was held in Barranquilla from 9 to 21 December. Cuba and Mexico withdrew.

The gold medal was won by Colombia who earned 12 points.

Squads

Table
2 points system used.

Results

Statistics

Goalscorers

References

External links
 

1946 Central American and Caribbean Games
1946